Nazarabad (also Romanized as Naz̄arābād and Naz̧arābād) is a village in Mirbag-e Shomali Rural District, in the Central District of Delfan County, Lorestan Province, Iran. At the 2006 census, its population was 218, in 40 families.

References 

Towns and villages in Delfan County